Tyler Tanner (born July 9, 1991) is an American professional stock car racing driver. He is the son of Kelly Tanner.

Racing career

Camping World Truck Series

Tanner made his debut in the Camping World Truck Series in the fall race at Martinsville in 2011, running the No. 65 Ford F-150 for MB Motorsports. In 2012, he attempted the spring Martinsville race, but failed to qualify. In 2014, Tanner returned at Phoenix running the No. 36 RAM for MB Motorsports and finished 21st. In 2015, Tanner ran 12 events split between MB Motorsports and MAKE Motorsports. His best finish was 15th at Kansas. He finished 28th in the championship.

K&N Pro Series West
His first start in the K&N West Series was in 2014 at Evergreen Speedway. Tanner started 6th and finished 7th. He's also the Winner of the 2014 "Mark Galloway 150" Super Late Model event at Evergreen Speedway. He made a return to the series in 2018 again at Evergreen and finished 5th for Jefferson Pitts Racing.

Personal life
He graduated from Arizona State in 2013 with a degree in Industrial Engineering and immediately landed a job as a manufacturing engineer.

Motorsports career results

NASCAR

(key) (Bold – Pole position awarded by qualifying time. Italics – Pole position earned by points standings or practice time. * – Most laps led.)

Camping World Truck Series

K&N Pro Series West

 Season still in progress
 Ineligible for series points

References

External links
 
 

Living people
1991 births
NASCAR drivers